A tape management system (TMS) is computer software that manages the usage and retention of computer backup tapes. This may be done as a stand-alone function or as part of a broader backup software package.

The role of a tape management system

A modern tape management system (TMS) is usually used in conjunction with backup applications and are generally used to manage magnetic tape media that contains backup information and other electronically stored information. Tape management systems are used by organizations to locate, track, and rotate media according to an organizations internal policies as well as government regulations.

Categories of tape management systems

Stand-alone tape management systems

Stand-alone tape management systems are predominant on mainframe platforms where tape is used as both a backup and base load storage medium.

Mainframe systems such as IBM's z/OS do provide some basic support for tape inventory control via the OS Catalog but as cataloging files is optional it is usually required that an additional software package does the following:

 Ensure that live tape volumes are not over-written.
 Keep a list of tape volumes that are eligible to be over-written (known as scratch tapes).
 Maintain an online catalog of the location of files written to tape and a list of what files reside on each tape volume.

These operations are usually achieved by using operating system "hooks" to intercept file open and close operations.

Backup applications

Robotic control systems

Off-line tape management systems

Commercially available tape management systems

Mainframe

Stand-alone tape management systems
 BrightStore CA-1 (previously known as UCC-1 when Computer Associates acquired Uccel in '87)
 CA Dynam/TLMS (previously known as TLMS II when CA acquired Capex Corporation in '82)
 IBM RMM
 BMC Control-M/Tape (previously known as Control-T when BMC Software acquired New Dimension Software in '99)
 ASG Zara
 Lascon Storage's GFS/AFM

Robotic control/management systems
 StorageTek HSC
 StorageTek ExLM

Distributed systems
 AES Webscan Tape Management System
TapeTrack Tape Management Framework
Vertices Tape Management System
VaultLedger Tape Management System

See also 

 List of backup software

Backup software
Storage software